The following is a list of Women's United Soccer Association stadiums. Included are the stadium names, dates of occupation, occupant, date of opening and location:

References

External links
  (via archive.org)

Stadiums
w
Women's United Soccer Association